John Lee Wortham (July 18, 1862 – November 4, 1924) was a member of the Railroad Commission of Texas in 1911, and Secretary of State of Texas in 1913. Wortham was born in Woodland, Freestone County, Texas. With his son Gus Wortham, he started the John L. Wortham and Son insurance agency. He died in Houston.

References

External links

John L. Wortham and Son Insurance

Secretaries of State of Texas
Businesspeople from Texas
1862 births
1924 deaths
20th-century American politicians